The 2000 Italian Formula 3000 Championship was contested over 8 rounds. 13 different teams, 40 different drivers competed. In this one-make formula all teams had to utilize Lola T96/50 chassis with Zytek engines.

Entries

Calendar

Results

Note
Race 5 Pole Position originally won by  Thomas Biagi, but all his times were cancelled and he started from last grid position.

Championships standings

References

External links
 Official Euroseries 3000 site

Formula 3000
Formula 3000
Auto GP
Italian Formula 3000